Akira Back (born Sung Ook Back in 1974 in Seoul, Korea), is a Michelin-Starred  chef. A family friend from Japan gave him the nickname "Akira" ("Ook" translates to "Akira" in Kanji).

Early life
Back was born and raised in Seoul, Korea. He took a serious interest in baseball at a young age and decided to move to Japan to pursue it. Back's baseball career ended shortly afterward, when his father's business took their family to the U.S. in 1989, eventually ending up in Aspen, Colorado.

At age 15, Back began his snowboarding career and spent 7 years on the professional snowboarding circuit. He appeared in various extreme sports movies. During the same period, he worked at the local Japanese restaurants to supplement his earnings. This motivated him to pursue a culinary career. He enrolled at The Art Institute in Colorado to study at the International Culinary School. It is also stated that he studied under Iron Chef Masaharu Morimoto.

Culinary career

After ending his snowboarding career, Back went on to study at the International Culinary School at The Art Institute of Colorado. In 1993, he began his first culinary job working at Kenichi in Aspen as sushi prep cook. He was later recruited to Kenichi in Austin, Texas and then in Kona, Hawaii, where he worked as the opening chef.

In 2008, Back debuted Yellowtail Japanese Restaurant & Lounge, Chef Akira Back at Bellagio Resort & Casino in Las Vegas. Featured dishes include Big Eye Tuna Pizza, Lobster Carpaccio, and Kobe Beef Tataki, among others. Yellowtail's celebrity clientele includes Taylor Swift, Eva Longoria, Wilmer Valderrama, Pink & Carey Hart, Mary-Kate and Ashley Olsen, Kelly Osbourne, David Arquette, Ryan Kewanten and Joe Jonas.

In 2017, Back's Dosa earned a Michelin Star. He has opened restaurants under his name, Akira Back, in different countries such as the US, UAE and South Korea.

Iron Chef
During the 2006 Food & Wine Magazine Classic in Aspen, a producer of Iron Chef America approached Back after tasting a menu that Back had presented. On March 16, 2008, Back appeared on the show together with Bobby Flay, saying that he loved it and "grew up with it".

Akira Back restaurant

References

Living people
People from Seoul
American people of Korean descent
American chefs
Asian American chefs
1974 births